A Better Fort was a community organization with a mission to provide positive experiences that make a difference in the lives of individuals within Fort Wayne, Indiana. Their focus was on community empowerment and the retention of young talent.

Activities

Mission 
During the years of 2010 through 2014, A Better Fort had a mission statement to provide positive life experiences that make a difference in the lives of individuals within Fort Wayne, Indiana. The focus is on community empowerment and the retention of young talent. Members can achieve their highest potential through service opportunities, philanthropic endeavors, innovative projects, and cultural discovery. Members prepare to lead the community through service, identity, empowerment, persistence, and education.

#HipHop4theCity 

HipHop4theCity was a community driven and collaborative music based project that resulted in the song and music video entitled MY CITY. The project brought together over a dozen local artists, producers and volunteers at the time of its creation and release in late 2011 and early 2012. The music video  amassed over 250,000 views and press coverage from both local and national publications.

The project showcased local talent, brought awareness to community involvement, the arts, and civic pride which garnered the attention of national economic development publications and blogs. It also sparked a chain of events pertaining to economic development in Northeast Indiana such as The My City Summit and the My City Pin. Nyzzy Nyce, one of the artists on the project, re-released a national rendition of the song on VEVO entitled MY CITY (National).

#House4aHouse 

House4aHouse started as an annual block party with a focus on Electronic Dance Music. The event donates $5,000 per year to a local non-profit organization, and in the first three years donated over $15,000 to the Mad Anthony’s Children's Hope House. In 2014 the event was carried on under the name, the BAALS Music Festival.

#Ball4ACause 

The annual charity basketball game features Fort Wayne’s Famous, from entertainment to politics. The two teams go head to head against each other to raise funds and awareness for two selected non-profit organizations in the community.

Zombie Prom 

The annual Halloween Zombie Prom and fundraiser takes place during Downtown Fort Wayne’s Fright Night festivities.

References

Organizations based in Fort Wayne, Indiana
2010 establishments in Indiana